Joseph Roger Brown, MBE (born 13 May 1941) is an English singer. As a rock and roll singer and guitarist, he has performed for more than six decades. He was a stage and television performer in the late 1950s and has primarily been a recording star since the early 1960s. He has made six films, presented specialist radio series for BBC Radio 2, appeared on the West End stage alongside Dame Anna Neagle and has written an autobiography. In recent years he has again concentrated on recording and performing music, playing two tours of around 100 shows every year and releasing an album almost every year.

Described by the Guinness Book of British Hit Singles & Albums as a "chirpy Cockney" (although he was born in Lincolnshire), Brown was one of the original artists managed by the early rock impresario and manager Larry Parnes. He is highly regarded in the music business as a "musician's musician" who "commands respect and admiration from a wide spectrum of artists".

Career
Brown was born in Swarby, Lincolnshire. His family moved to London when he was two and ran the Sultan public house in Grange Road, Plaistow, then in Essex, now part of the London Borough of Newham. In 1956, Brown formed a skiffle group, The Spacemen, which lasted until the skiffle movement faded towards the end of the 1950s. He worked for British Railways at their Plaistow Locomotive works for two years in the late 1950s, becoming a steam locomotive fireman. He left the job because "the smell of the diesels drove me out when they took over from steam".

In 1958, Brown was spotted by television producer Jack Good who hired him as lead guitarist in the orchestra of his new TV series, Boy Meets Girls. During this period, he backed a number of US musicians such as Gene Vincent and Eddie Cochran on their UK tours.

1960s
Brown signed a management agreement with Larry Parnes. Parnes attempted to change Brown's stage name to 'Elmer Twitch', a story which Brown still refers to on occasion during his live sets. Brown signed to Decca Records. He charted with "The Darktown Strutters' Ball" in 1960, and had UK Top 10 hits on the Piccadilly label in 1962–63 with "A Picture of You", which reached number two on the NME charts (the main chart of the day); "It Only Took A Minute", and "That's What Love Will Do". Piccadilly's release of Brown's "Crazy Mixed Up Kid" in April 1961 was the label's first single. Brown's recording band was a collection of session musicians, and was named the Bruvvers by Jack Good, to give Brown the identity of having his own backing band for record releases. It was in 1962, when he needed a band to tour with him, that 'Joe Brown and the Bruvvers' was cemented, containing two members of the Spacemen, brothers Tony and Pete Oakman, who had also remained with him in the "Boy Meets Girls" band.

Brown was voted 'Top UK Vocal Personality' in the 1962 NME magazine poll. During the 1960s he appeared in a number of films, pantomime and stage musicals. In December 1963, the film What a Crazy World, based on a stage play, starring Brown and Marty Wilde among others, had its world premiere in London. Brown also starred in the hit musical Charlie Girl in the West End between 1965 and 1968; and in the musical comedy film Three Hats for Lisa in 1965 with Una Stubbs, Sophie Hardy and Sid James. He also made a cameo appearance as himself in the 1964 film The Beauty Jungle, and presented the children's television series Joe & Co on BBC Television.

1970s and after 
In 1972, he formed another band, Brown's Home Brew, which played rock and roll, country and gospel music and featured his wife, Vicki Brown, and Pete Oakman from the Bruvvers. This eclectic collection of musical styles, together with his hits, became the basis of his live sets ever since.

In the 1980s, Brown presented a daytime quiz show on Granada TV called Square One; its success led him to recording a pilot for the prime time game show The Price Is Right but ATV selected Leslie Crowther for the full-time presenting role when the series launched.

He also hosted Show Me, an early evening game show produced by Anglia Television and aired on ITV for one series in 1987, and made a brief appearance as Dudley, a crooked club owner, in the 1986 film Mona Lisa, opposite Bob Hoskins.

George Harrison was best man at Brown's second wedding in 2000; Brown had appeared on two songs on Harrison's album Gone Troppo, and also was featured on a track on Harrison's last album, Brainwashed. Following Harrison's death from lung cancer on 29 November 2001, Brown appeared with his group at the tribute concert Concert for George, held on the first anniversary of his death. Brown played guitar whilst singing "Here Comes the Sun", mandolin on "That's The Way It Goes," and ukulele on the closing number, "I'll See You in My Dreams".

Brown still performs and makes occasional television appearances. In 2005, he co-wrote a musical, Don't You Rock Me Daddio, with songwriter Roger Cook, while in December 2006, he was one of three guest hosts of Sounds of the '60s on BBC Radio 2 during the absence of host Brian Matthew, having already presented two series on rock and roll for the same station.

In 2008, Brown's 50th anniversary celebrations included a UK gold album for sales over 100,000 copies of Joe Brown - The Very Best Of, a 37-date spring tour, an all-star concert at the Royal Albert Hall with Mark Knopfler, Jools Holland, Dennis Locorriere, Dave Edmunds, Sam Brown, Chas & Dave and others, and a 36-date autumn-winter tour.

His album More of the Truth was released in the UK on 13 October 2008 and, in 2009, the US musical instrument manufacturer Kala launched a series of 'Joe Brown' ukuleles. At the Mojo magazine's awards in London on 11 June 2009, Brown was presented with the lifetime award for outstanding contribution to music after 51 years' recording. Mojo'''s album, Harrison Covered'' (November 2011), to mark the tenth anniversary of George Harrison's death, included Brown's recording of the former's "That's the Way It Goes".

in 2014 Brown pulled out of the Village Pump Folk Festival for medical reasons. Due to headline the Friday night of the event taking place from 25 July, he was replaced by Peatbog Faeries.

Honours 
Brown was appointed Member of the Order of the British Empire (MBE)  for services to music in the 2009 Birthday Honours.

In late 2010, Brown was asked by Rick Parfitt of Status Quo to support them for the arena section (nine shows) of their UK tour in late 2010, and he continued to tour throughout 2011. A triple DVD and CD set of the latter tour was released of his show at the Liverpool Philharmonic.

Personal life 
Brown married Victoria Mary Haseman, a singer with both the Vernons Girls and the Breakaways, who then became known as Vicki Brown.  Latterly a session singer, she died of cancer in 1991. Their daughter, Sam Brown, is also a singer, and their son, Pete Brown, is a record producer, who produced all but one of Brown's nine most recent albums, and also tours with him. In 2000, Joe Brown married Manon Pearcey, former partner of the former Small Faces singer Steve Marriott.

Discography

References

External links

IMDB Profile
Album discography

1941 births
Living people
English male singers
English rock guitarists
English male guitarists
English radio presenters
English television presenters
English male film actors
English male stage actors
Members of the Order of the British Empire
People from North Kesteven District
People from Plaistow, Newham
British mandolinists
British rock and roll musicians